This list of museums in the Australian Capital Territory, Australia contains museums that are defined for this context as institutions (including nonprofit organizations, government entities, and private businesses) that collect and care for objects of cultural, artistic, scientific, or historical interest and make their collections or related exhibits available for public viewing. Also included are non-profit art galleries and university art galleries.

See also
List of museums in Australia

Australian Capital Territory

Museums